Alisea is an extinct genus of prehistoric bony fish that lived during the Upper Miocene subepoch.

References

Clupeiformes
Miocene fish
Neogene animals of North America